Eli Henderson Park at Janney Furnace is a park surrounding a fifty-foot tall stone furnace in Ohatchee, Alabama.  The furnace was built in 1863 by Alfred Janney to produce pig iron due to the prevalence of iron ore in what is now the park. A July 1864 Union raid destroyed all but the stone chimney, which still remains. The furnace is now surrounded by the Calhoun County Confederate Memorial, built by Sons of Confederate Veterans in June 2003; and the 2009 Confederate and Native American Museum, which includes Civil War and Native American artifacts dating back to the Iron Age. The Confederate Memorial is the world's largest black granite confederate memorial.  The furnace was listed on the National Register of Historic Places in 1976 and the surrounding park was re-named in honor of Eli Henderson in 2020, who sought to preserve it.

Gallery

See also
List of Civil War Discovery Trail sites

References

External links

Official site

National Register of Historic Places in Calhoun County, Alabama
Industrial buildings and structures on the National Register of Historic Places in Alabama
Ironworks and steel mills in Alabama
Industrial buildings completed in 1863
Protected areas of Calhoun County, Alabama